Alfa Corp. v. OAO Alfa-Bank, 475 F. Supp. 2d 357 (S.D.N.Y. 2007), was a trademark case brought to the U.S. District Court for the Southern District of New York. The case eventually allowed Wikipedia to be used as a legitimate source. The underlying trademark dispute was settled out of court.

Background
The case was a trademark dispute centered around the use of the name Alfa. Alfa Corporation, of Montgomery, Alabama sued the Russian company Alfa-Bank for trademark infringement. Alfa Corporation of Alabama is commonly known as Alfa insurance, while the Russian Alfa-Bank is part of the larger Alfa Group of companies.

Alfa Corporation of Alabama is commonly known as Alfa Insurance. The company primarily offer insurance, but it also owns subsidiaries that provide services in the banking industry.

Alfa-Bank is a unit of the Russian based finance company Alfa Group, which provides financial services, primarily in Russia and surrounding countries, but also in Europe and the United States. The name Alfa-Bank is a transliteration of the company's Russian name of Альфа-Банк.

In the case, Alfa Insurance argued that Alfa Group's name would harm Alfa Insurance as it was likely to cause confusion between the two companies. Alfa Insurance argued that Alfa Group was committing trademark infringement.

Evidence 
Plaintiff Alfa Corp. sought to introduce the expert testimony of Constantine Muravnik. Mr. Muravnik was to testify as to the transliteration of the Russian name into English. The defendants Alfa-Bank objected to the introductions of the expert witness and sought to have the testimony excluded.

The plaintiff sought to introduce the expert testimony of Muravnik's regarding the proper transliteration of the defendant company’s name.  Muravnik is a native Russian speaker who is now Senior Lector in Slavic Languages and Literatures specializing in Russian at Yale University.  He has taught Russian since 1991 and also worked for over ten years as a Russian/English interpreter and translator.  Muravnik holds Master's Degrees in Russian Linguistics and Literature from Moscow State University and in Slavic Languages and Literatures from Yale University; he is currently a Ph.D. candidate at Yale.

The defendants object to Mr. Muravnik’s testimony on the grounds that his opinions should be excluded because they are based on "inherently unreliable" internet sources. The defendants cite both Mr. Muravnik's references to Wikipedia and his use of internet sites such as the online version of Pravda.

The court held that the use of internet sources (in general or the specific ones used by Mr. Muravnik) in forming the basis of expert testimony is not inherently unreliable.  The court cited a recent and highly publicized analysis in the magazine Nature which found that the error rate of Wikipedia entries was not significantly greater than in those of the Encyclopædia Britannica. Jim Giles, Internet Encyclopaedias Go Head to Head (Dec. 14, 2005) (finding that “the difference in accuracy was not particularly great: the average science entry in Wikipedia contained around four inaccuracies; Britannica, about three.”)

Furthermore, the court noted that Alfa Group was unable to identify any errors in Muravnik's testimony. Therefore, despite the potential liability of Wikipedia, references it alone does not make an experts testimony inadmissible in court.

Outcome 
The underlying trademark dispute was settled out of court. Alfa Group agreed not to infringement on Alfa Insurance's trademarks. No money was exchanged in the settlement.

References

External links
 

2007 in United States case law
United States District Court for the Southern District of New York cases
United States trademark case law
Wikipedia reliability
Alfa Group